The Marmaton River (MAR-muh-tuhn) is a  tributary of the Little Osage River in southeastern Kansas and western Missouri in the United States.  Via the Little Osage, Osage and Missouri rivers, it is part of the watershed of the Mississippi River.

Course
The Marmaton River rises in Kansas northeast of Moran in eastern Allen County and flows generally eastward through Bourbon County in Kansas and Vernon County in Missouri, past the towns of Uniontown, Redfield and Fort Scott in Kansas and Deerfield in Missouri.

Name
Marmaton is a corruption of Marmiton, a French name given by fur traders meaning "scullion".

See also
List of Kansas rivers
List of Missouri rivers
Battle of Marmiton River

References

Columbia Gazetteer of North America entry
DeLorme (2003).  Kansas Atlas & Gazetteer.  Yarmouth, Maine: DeLorme.  .
DeLorme (2002).  Missouri Atlas & Gazetteer.  Yarmouth, Maine: DeLorme.  .

Rivers of Kansas
Rivers of Missouri
Rivers of Allen County, Kansas
Rivers of Bourbon County, Kansas
Rivers of Vernon County, Missouri
Tributaries of the Missouri River